This is a list of regions of Denmark by Human Development Index as of 2023 with data for the year 2021.

There are 5 regions of Denmark in total, all of which exceed very high development on the Human Development Index. In 2021, The Capital Region of Denmark had the highest development of any region. Denmark was ranked 6th on the Human Development globally in 2021.

References 

Denmark

Denmark
Human Development Index